Mamonovo, prior to 1945 known by its German name Heiligenbeil ( or Świętomiejsce; ; Prussian: Swintamīstan), is a town in Kaliningrad Oblast, Russia. Population figures:

Etymology
Mamonovo is named after a Soviet Commander, Nikolay Mamonov, killed in action near Pułtusk on October 26, 1944, who was posthumously awarded the title Hero of the Soviet Union on March 24, 1945.

History

Under the Teutonic Knights Heiligenstadt was built near an Old Prussian settlement. It was later renamed Heiligenbeil after a holy axe used by Augustinian monks, established in the area by Grand Master Winrich von Kniprode after the Battle of Rudau, to cut down an oak tree worshiped by pagan Prussians. It came under the bishopric of Warmia, then to the territory of Natangia. Since 1440, the town was a founding member of the anti-Teutonic Prussian Confederation, upon the request of which, Polish King Casimir IV Jagiellon incorporated the region and town to the Kingdom of Poland in 1454. Then the Thirteen Years' War, the longest of all Polish–Teutonic wars, broke out, after which the region and town became part of Poland as a fief held by the Teutonic Knights, and after 1525 held by secular Ducal Prussia. From 1701, the town was part of the Kingdom of Prussia, and from 1871 it was also part of Germany, within which it was located in the province of East Prussia.

During World War II, in 1944–1945, it was the location of the Heiligenbeil concentration camp, a subcamp of the Stutthof concentration camp, in which the Germans imprisoned around 1,100 Jewish women and 100 Jewish men as forced labour. Towards the end of the war in fierce fighting between January and March 1945 the Heiligenbeil pocket fell to the Red Army. It was captured by Red Army on March 26, 1945, and was soon integrated into the Kaliningrad Oblast. It took its present name in 1946. The defending 4th Army's archives were buried in a forest near the town and found in 2004, in an area still littered with debris from the final battles.

Administrative and municipal status
Within the framework of administrative divisions, it is, together with four rural localities, incorporated as the town of oblast significance of Mamonovo — an administrative unit with the status equal to that of the districts. As a municipal division, the town of oblast significance of Mamonovo is incorporated as Mamonovsky Urban Okrug.

Notable people
 Rudolf von Auerswald  (1795–1866) in 1824 he acquired an estate in the Heiligenbeil District and became Landrat (district administrator)

References

Notes

Sources

Cities and towns in Kaliningrad Oblast
Poland–Russia border crossings